Antal Kocsis (17 November 1905 – 25 October 1994) was a Hungarian boxer who competed in the 1928 Summer Olympics. In 1928 he won the gold medal in the flyweight class after winning the final against Armand Apell of France. He was born in Budapest-Kispest and died in Titusville, United States. His character plays a small but memorable role in Vilmos Kondor's 2012 novel Budapest Noir.

Olympic results
Round of 32: bye
Round of 16: José Villanova (Spain) points
Quarterfinal: Defeated Hubert Ausböck (Germany) points
Semifinal: Defeated Carlo Cavagnoli (Italy) points
Final: Defeated Armand Apell (France) points (won gold medal)

References
 profile

External links
 

1905 births
1994 deaths
Flyweight boxers
Olympic boxers of Hungary
Boxers at the 1928 Summer Olympics
Olympic gold medalists for Hungary
Olympic medalists in boxing
Hungarian emigrants to the United States
Martial artists from Budapest
Hungarian male boxers
Medalists at the 1928 Summer Olympics